Sulphide Creek Falls is a tall, moderately large volume waterfall within North Cascades National Park in Washington state. The falls drop from Sulphide Lake (elevation ) on the southeast side of Mount Shuksan down a narrow flume-like canyon to a broad basin below. Because of the narrow, twisting shape of the canyon the waterfall is exceptionally difficult to see from ground-level perspectives. Foot access to the bottom of the waterfall involves  of off-trail travel in extremely brushy terrain and several potentially dangerous fords of a large stream.

Other waterfalls
Another waterfall, which is on the opposite side of the valley and joins Sulphide Creek Falls at its base, should not be confused with Sulphide Creek Falls. This falls is much more visible, but only about one-half as high as Sulphide Creek Falls. This falls is sometimes referred to as Sulphide Valley Falls.
Above Sulphide Lake is a further  of cascades, informally referred to as Sulphide Basin Falls, flowing from the Sulphide and Crystal Glaciers, which provide most of the water that flows over Sulphide Creek Falls. This drop is geographically separate from Sulphide Creek Falls, and should not be confused with it, despite their close proximity and location on the same feeder stream.

Access
There is no trail to Sulphide Creek Falls. The closest trail is the Baker River Trail, which parallels the Baker River (which Sulphide Creek flows into). The trail crosses Sulphide Creek at the confluence. Thick avalanche brush prevents further access.

References

External links
 Sulphide Creek Falls photo gallery at pbase.com

North Cascades of Washington (state)
Waterfalls of Washington (state)
Waterfalls of Whatcom County, Washington
North Cascades National Park
Tiered waterfalls